Mushbooh is a food designation in Islam.

For Islam, Mushbooh (Mashbooh) means doubtful or suspect. If one is not sure about the slaughtering process or the ingredients used while preparing the food, then those items are considered as Mushbooh.

There are few ingredients that can be prepared from animals or from plants as well; in that case, it is difficult for someone to understand if the food is Halal or Haram.Foods containing ingredients such as gelatin, enzymes, emulsifiers, etc. are questionable (Mashbooh) because the origin of these ingredients is not known.

Islamic laws always recommend people not to eat any Mushbooh foods in order to protect their religion.

Diets
Religion-based diets
Food law
Islamic cuisine